Adapa is an Indian surname. Notable people with the surname include:

Rambabu Adapa, American engineer
Shashidhar Adapa (born 1955), Indian production designer, set designer and puppet designer

Indian surnames